Kingsley Owusu (born 3 August 2002) is a Ghanaian professional footballer who plays as a defender for Ghanaian Premier League side Dreams F.C.

Club career 
Owusu began his career with Dreams FC in their youth team, Still Believe FC, broke into the starting line-up of Dreams FC from the youth academy in 2019. In 2019, ahead of the 2019 GFA Normalization Committee Special Competition, he was promoted to the first team. He made his debut on 31 March 2019, being named on the starting line-up in a 1–0 loss to Hearts of Oak. He went on to make 9 league matches. During the 2019–20 Ghana Premier League, he made 10 league matches before the league was put on hold and later cancelled as a result of the COVID-19 pandemic. In October 2020, he signed a new three-year deal to keep at the club until 2023. He was included in the club's squad list for the 2020–21 Ghana Premier League in the club's bid to push for a top 4 league position at the end of the season.

International career 
At the age of 14, Owusu was part of the Ghana u17 team for the 2017 Africa U-17 Cup of Nations that featured and placed second, and qualified for the 2017 FIFA U-17 World Cup. He was invited by Paa Kwesi Fabin to be included in the Ghana 26-man u17 preliminary team for camping for the World Cup but missed out on the final cut.

He also received a call-up in the Ghana u20 team for the 2020 WAFU ‘B’ U20 tournament, but missed out on the final cut.

References

External links 

 

Living people
2003 births
Association football defenders
Ghanaian footballers
Dreams F.C. (Ghana) players
Ghana Premier League players